Life: A Natural History of the First Four Billion Years of Life on Earth is a book about natural history by British paleontologist Richard A. Fortey. It was originally published in hardcover in Great Britain by HarperCollins Publishers, under the title Life: An Unauthorised Biography. Fortey used this book to explain how life has evolved over the last four billion years. He discusses evolution, biology, the origin of life, and paleontology.  Under its various titles Fortey's book has become a best-seller; according to WorldCat, it is in over a thousand public libraries in the United States alone.

1997 non-fiction books
English-language books
HarperCollins books
Paleontology books